Mäntylä is a Finnish surname. Notable people with the surname include:

Hanna Mäntylä (born 1974), Finnish politician
Jasmin Mäntylä (born 1982), Finnish model and singer
Matti Mäntylä (born 1945), Finnish actor
Tero Mäntylä (born 1991), Finnish footballer
Tuukka Mäntylä (born 1981), Finnish ice hockey player

Finnish-language surnames